24 is a 2021 Singaporean art house film directed by Royston Tan, starring James Choong.

Cast
 James Choong as the sound engineer
 Xiao Li Yuan as Zhang Xiao Wu
 Royston Tan as himself

Release
The film premiered at the Busan International Film Festival on 10 October 2021.

Reception
John Berra of Screen Daily wrote that the film "is utterly delightful on a scene-by-scene basis as characters are vividly sketched through glimpses of life, work, and artistic pursuits."

Morris Yang of the International Cinephile Society rated the film 4 stars out of 5, writing that the film "is filled with the graceful celebration of life precisely by representing it through the spaces it evokes, common or unique, sanctioned or underground".

References

External links
 
 

2021 films
Singaporean independent films